"Come Away with Me" is a song written, produced, and performed by American recording artist Norah Jones. The ballad was released on September 30, 2002, as the third single from her debut studio album, Come Away with Me (2002).

The song reached number 21 on the US Billboard Adult Top 40 and number two in Canada. It also peaked at number five in Spain and number 80 in the United Kingdom. "Come Away with Me" was included on the soundtrack for the film Maid in Manhattan (2002).

Music video
The music video of the song was directed by James Frost and shows Norah driving a car in a California desert. The video was released in 2003.

Track listings
Canadian and UK CD single
 "Come Away with Me" – 3:18
 "Turn Me On" (live) – 5:08
 "Cold, Cold Heart" (live) – 4:39
 Both live tracks were recorded at the House of Blues, Chicago, on April 16, 2002

European CD single
 "Come Away with Me" – 3:18
 "Feelin' the Same Way" – 2:55

Credits and personnel
Credits are lifted from the UK CD single and the Come Away with Me album booklet.

Studios
 Recorded at Sorcerer Sound (New York City)
 Mixed at Sear Sound (New York City)
 Mastered at Sterling Sound (New York City)

Personnel

 Norah Jones – writing, vocals, piano
 Jesse Harris – acoustic guitar
 Adam Levy – electric guitar
 Lee Alexander – bass
 Dan Rieser – drums
 Arif Mardin – production, mixing
 Jay Newland – engineering, mixing
 Dick Kondas – assistant engineering
 Ted Jensen – mastering

Charts

Weekly charts

Year-end charts

Certifications

Release history

References

Norah Jones songs
2000s ballads
2002 songs
2003 singles
Blue Note Records singles
Parlophone singles
Song recordings produced by Arif Mardin
Songs written by Norah Jones